Joseph Hilger (1903 – 29 March 1990) was a Luxembourgian sprinter and long jumper. He competed in three events at the 1924 Summer Olympics.

References

External links
 

1903 births
1990 deaths
Luxembourgian male sprinters
Luxembourgian male long jumpers
Olympic athletes of Luxembourg
Athletes (track and field) at the 1924 Summer Olympics